A cholecystoenterostomy is a surgical procedure in which the gall bladder is joined to the small intestine. It is performed in order to allow bile to pass from the liver to the intestine when the common bile duct is obstructed by an irremovable cause.

References

Abdominal surgical procedures
Colorectal surgery
Accessory digestive gland surgery